RAF Ashbourne is a former Royal Air Force airfield located approximately  south-east of the town of Ashbourne, Derbyshire, England.

It was opened on 12 June 1942 before closing on 23 August 1954.

Construction

Construction of the airfield began in late 1941 to Class-A bomber standards comprising three paved runways (concrete and woodchip surface) in an "leaning A" formation, 30 "frying-pan" style hard standings, four T2 hangars, a control tower and assorted technical buildings. Although at  AMSL the altitude of the area was above the ceiling height for construction of airfields, the necessity of defensive installations during the Second World War overrode this condition.

History

Ashbourne was home to Armstrong Whitworth Whitley, Armstrong Whitworth Albemarle and Bristol Blenheim aircraft.

Originally planned as a satellite installation of RAF Seighford for Vickers Wellington bombers, due to the unsuitability of altitude and local weather it was relegated to a training role with its own satellite of RAF Darley Moor.

Post war it was used for storage and maintenance of ordnance where the bombs were stored along the runways.

Based units

There were three small units in operation based at Ashbourne:
 Relief Landing Ground of No. 18 (Pilots) Advanced Flying Unit RAF (March 1945)
 No. 42 Operational Training Unit RAF (OTU) (October 1943)
 No. 81 OTU (July 1942 - January 1944)
 Sub site of No. 28 Maintenance Unit RAF (May 1945 - August 1954)

Current use

The western half of the site is now an industrial estate, appropriately named Airfield Industrial Estate. The northern half has been used by JCB as a test and demonstration ground for various earth moving products but is now deserted. The north western part of the airfield is now a housing estate.

On the South-East side, part of one runway remains usable, and a 2017 document mentioned 5 aeroplanes based

References

Citations

Bibliography

External links
 Air of Authority - A History of RAF Organisation - No 42 Operational Training Unit

Royal Air Force stations in Derbyshire
Military units and formations established in 1942
Military units and formations disestablished in 1954